Ami Neta Hobo; is a 2018 Bangladeshi political drama film directed by Uttam Akash and produced by Selim Khan. The film stars Shakib Khan and Bidya Sinha Mim in the lead roles. The cast also includes Omar Sunny and Moushumi. The film is produced by Shapla Media and Indian production house Eskay Movies.

The film is also the second collaboration between Shakib Khan and Mim, who have previously appeared together in the film Amar Praner Priya in 2009. The film is released on 16 February 2018.

Cast
 Shakib Khan as Shakib Khan Sakku
 Bidya Sinha Saha Mim as Sundori
 Omar Sunny as Sakku's brother in law
 Moushumi as Sakku's sister
 Sadek Bachchu as Akkas Bepari 
 Kabila as Kabila
 Shiba Shanu as
 DJ Shohel
 Amir Siraji
 Siraj Haider
 Md Jakir Hossain as (Actor) Raju

Soundtrack 
The soundtrack of Ami Neta Hobo is composed by Akassh, Ali Akram Shuvo, Shree Pritam and Ahamed Humaun. The first song from the soundtrack, the item song "Lal Lipstick", is sung and composed by Akassh and also features Trisha Chatterjee. The second track of the film Chumma was released on 28 January 2018, in the banner of Eskay Music. The film third song Im in Love was released on 14 February 2018, on the occasion of Valentine's Day and also last song Ghurchhi Ajo Pothe Pothe was released a few days later.

Track listing

References

External links 
 

2018 films
2010s political drama films
Bengali-language Bangladeshi films
Bangladeshi political drama films
Films scored by Ali Akram Shuvo
Films scored by Ahmed Humayun
Films scored by Shree Pritam
Films scored by Akassh
2010s Bengali-language films
Films directed by Uttam Akash
Political action films
2018 drama films
Shapla Media films